While polygamous marriages are not legally recognized under Malawi's civil marriage laws, customary law affords a generous amount of benefits to polygamous unions, ranging from inheritance rights to child custody. It has been estimated that nearly one in five women in Malawi live in polygamous relationships.

Efforts to outlaw polygamy 
In the 2000s, there were efforts to abolish the practice and legal recognition of polygamy; these were led mainly by anti-AIDS organizations and feminist groups.  Islamic religious leaders opposed an effort in 2008 to outlaw polygamy.

See also 
 Polygyny in Islam

References 

Society of Malawi
Malawi
Women's rights in Malawi